San Bruno Station may refer to the following stations in San Bruno, California, US:
San Bruno station (BART)
San Bruno station (Caltrain)